This is a list of properties and districts in Banks County, Georgia that are listed on the National Register of Historic Places (NRHP).

Current listings

|}

References

Banks
Banks County, Georgia
National Register of Historic Places in Banks County, Georgia